Deh-e Pabid (also Romanized as Deh-e Pābīd, Deh-e Pabīd, and Dehpābīd; also known as Deh Pābad and Pabid) is a village in Eskelabad Rural District, Nukabad District, Khash County, Sistan and Baluchestan Province, Iran. At the 2006 census, its population was 1,310, in 258 families.

References 

Populated places in Khash County